AJSS (Les Saintes)
Amical Club (Grand-Bourg de Marie Galante)
AS Dragon (Gosier)
CS Moulien
Evolucas (Lamentin)
JS Vieux-Habitants
Juventus SA (Sainte-Anne)
La Gauloise (Basse-Terre)
L'Etoile de Morne-à-l'Eau
Phare Petit-Canal
Red Star (Baie Mahault)
Siroco (Abymes)
Stade Lamentinois (Lamentin)
USR Sainte-Rose

Guadeloupe
 

Football clubs